Armelie Kalonda Lumanu (born March 30, 1988) is a Congolese basketball player. She was drafted in the 2010 WNBA Draft by the Indiana Fever

FIBA competitions
Lumanu played in the following events:

2007 FIBA Africa Championship for Women
2005 FIBA Africa Championship for Women	
2005 FIBA Women's U19 World Championship
2004 U18 African Championship for Women

Personal life
Lumanu majored in physical education at Mississippi State University. She has a brother and a sister.

References

External links
FEVER:Q&A with Armelie Lumanu

1988 births
Living people
Democratic Republic of the Congo expatriates in the United States
Democratic Republic of the Congo women's basketball players
Democratic Republic of the Congo expatriate basketball people in the United States
Forwards (basketball)
Guards (basketball)
Indiana Fever draft picks
Mississippi State Bulldogs women's basketball players
Southeastern Illinois Falcons women's basketball players
Basketball players from Kinshasa
21st-century Democratic Republic of the Congo people